Ivo Rüegg (born 15 April 1971) is a Swiss bobsledder who competed between 1996 and 2010. He won five medals at the FIBT World Championships with two golds (Two-man: 2009, Four-man: 2007), two silvers Two-man: 2007, Mixed team: 2009), and a bronze (Mixed team: 2007).

Rüegg grew up in Tuggen and took part in several different sports in his youth, including skiing, gymnastics, athletics, football and ice hockey. He acted as a forerunner for the prestigious Lauberhorn downhill race in Wengen, and also competed in Europa Cup and FIS Tour alpine skiing events before leaving the sport in the early 1990s due to back problems. In addition he competed in steinstossen (stone-throwing) competitions  (winning multiple national individual and team titles) and decathlon during the 1990s, breaking the decathlon points record for the canton of Schwyz in 1994 and 1996 and setting a personal best of 7,071 points.

He first tried bobsleigh as a push athlete in 1992, before starting as a driver in 1996 and taking the Swiss junior title the same year and taking two bronze medals at the 1997 Junior World Championship. In his subsequent career he won one bronze and five silver medals in the Bobsleigh European Championship, one World Cup race (a two-man event at Cesana Pariol in 2007) and four Swiss national titles (two in each of the two-man and four man disciplines).

Rüegg competed in two Winter Olympics, earning his best finish of fourth in the two-man event at Vancouver in 2010.

He won the Bobsleigh World Cup championship in the two-man event in 2009-10. In May 2010 he announced his retirement from top-level sporting competition.

Ivo is the nephew of Tony Rüegg and Max Rüegg, the cousin of Ralph Rüegg, and the brother of Reto Rüegg, all of whom were also bobsledders.

References
 
 
 
 
 Bobsleigh two-man world championship medalists since 1931
 Bobsleigh four-man world championship medalists since 1930
 List of two-man bobsleigh World Cup champions since 1985
 Mixed bobsleigh-skeleton world championship medalists since 2007

1971 births
Living people
Sportspeople from the canton of St. Gallen
Swiss male bobsledders
Olympic bobsledders of Switzerland
Bobsledders at the 2006 Winter Olympics
Bobsledders at the 2010 Winter Olympics
21st-century Swiss people